is a Japanese artistic gymnast.

Competitive history

Detailed results

See also 
 Japan men's national gymnastics team

References

External links 
 Kakuto Murayama at FIG website

Japanese male artistic gymnasts
Sportspeople from Okayama Prefecture
2000 births
Living people
21st-century Japanese people